The name Rosing has been used in the Philippines by PAGASA for nine tropical cyclones in the Western Pacific.
 Typhoon Kit (1963) (T6318, 35W, Rosing) – became a Category 4-equivalent super typhoon but did not affect any land areas.
 Typhoon Marge (1967) (T6718, 22W, Rosing) – struck the Philippines.
 Typhoon Lucy (1971) (T7116, 17W, Rosing) – struck the Philippines and China.
 Typhoon June (1975) (T7520, 23W, Rosing) – one of the most intense tropical cyclones on record, reaching 875 millibars.
 Typhoon Owen (1979) (T7915, 19W, Rosing) – struck Japan and caused 12 deaths.
 Severe Tropical Storm Joe (1983) (T8314, 15W, Rosing) – struck the Philippines and China.
 Tropical Storm Maury (1987) (T8721, 21W, Rosing) – struck the Philippines and Vietnam.
 Typhoon Mireille (1991) (T9119, 21W, Rosing) – struck Japan and became the country's costliest typhoon ever.
 Typhoon Angela (1995) (T9520, 29W, Rosing) – a strong Category 5-equivalent typhoon that caused 882 fatalities and severe damage across the Philippines.

The name Rosing was retired because of the destruction it caused in the Philippines in 1995.

Pacific typhoon set index articles